Piotr Gawęcki (born May 24, 1989) is a Polish footballer who plays as a striker for Gjøvik FF.

Club career
Born in Kielce, Gawęcki started his senior career with Korona Kielce's reserve team. His First League debut came on August 27, 2008 in 3–0 win against GKP Gorzów Wielkopolski as a substitute coming off the bench in the 46th minute. In this match he scored his first goal for Korona Kielce.

In August 2010, he was loaned to Dolcan Zabki on a one-year deal. He was released from Dolcan Ząbki on June 27, 2011.

In July 2012, he signed for the Norwegian club Gjøvik FF On August 4, 2012, he scored two debut goals in the 2–2 draw against Lillehammer FK, and he became Man of the Match.

References

External links
 Profile at Soccerway
 

Living people
1989 births
Sportspeople from Kielce
Association football forwards
Polish footballers
Ząbkovia Ząbki players
Korona Kielce players
Expatriate footballers in Norway